Ellensburg High School is a secondary school in Ellensburg, Washington, operated by the Ellensburg School District.

Academics

Qualified 11th and 12th grade students may take classes at Central Washington University and earn both high school and college credit through the Running Start program.

Notable alumni
Gary Lee Conner - Musician, Screaming Trees
Van Conner - Musician, Screaming Trees
Mark Lanegan - Musician, Screaming Trees
Brian Habib - NFL Offensive Guard 1989 - 2001, Super Bowl XXXII (1998) champion, Denver Broncos
Ja'Warren Hooker - Track Athlete
Brian Haley - Comedian, actor, and writer
Kayla Standish - College and Australian basketball player

References

External links
Ellensburg High School website

High schools in Kittitas County, Washington
Public high schools in Washington (state)